Menaka Srimani de Silva (born January 26, 1985) is a Sri Lankan swimmer, who specialized in sprint freestyle events. She held a Sri Lankan record from the national championships in 2003 (28.28), until it was eventually broken by 13-year-old Kimiko Raheen nine years later (2012).

De Silva qualified for the women's 50 m freestyle at the 2004 Summer Olympics in Athens, by receiving a Universality place from FINA, in an entry time of 28.48. She challenged seven other swimmers in heat four, including 31-year-old Melanie Slowing of Guatemala. She raced to seventh place by two tenths of a second behind Nicaragua's Geraldine Arce in 28.93. De Silva failed to advance into the semifinals, as she placed fifty-second overall out of 75 swimmers on the last day of preliminaries.

References

External links
 

1985 births
Living people
Sri Lankan female swimmers
Olympic swimmers of Sri Lanka
Swimmers at the 2004 Summer Olympics
Sri Lankan female freestyle swimmers
Swimmers from Colombo
South Asian Games silver medalists for Sri Lanka
South Asian Games medalists in swimming